Isaac ben Abraham (יצחק בן אברהם), also called Rabbi Isaac ha-Baḥur (Hebrew: ר"י הבחור or רבי יצחק הבחור, which translates to "Rabbi Isaac the Younger") and by its Hebrew acronym RIBA (ריב"א) or RIẒBA (ריצב"א), was a tosafist of the late twelfth and early thirteenth centuries.

He succeeded his teacher Isaac ben Samuel as head of the school of Dampierre, after which place he is often called, as well as by the epithet Isaac ha-Baḥur ("the younger"), to distinguish him from his teacher, Isaac ben Samuel ha-Zaḳen ("the elder") (ר"י הזקן).

Life 
Together with his brother, Samson ben Abraham of Sens, Isaac lived as a youth at Troyes, where he attended the lectures of Jacob Tam, and afterward at Sens, before the two studied together at Dampierre. Isaac died at Dampierre prior to 1210, not long before his brother Samson emigrated to Palestine.
 
Isaac was one of the French rabbis to whom Meïr ben Todros Abulafia addressed his letter against Maimonides' theory of resurrection.  He is mentioned often in the edited tosafot, and by many other authorities, so it may be concluded that he wrote tosafot to several Talmudic treatises. Those to Bekorot were in the possession of Ḥayyim Michael of Hamburg. There are also frequently mentions to him as a Biblical commentator, and his ritual decisions and responsa are often quoted.

Isaac ben Abraham ha-Baḥur may also be identical with the liturgical poet Isaac ben Abraham who wrote a hymn beginning Yeshabbeḥuneka be-ḳol miflal, for Simchat Torah or for the Sabbath after it, and a selichah for Yom Kippur beginning Hen yom ba la-Adonai.

No complete work by him has survived, but his statements are cited in the tosafot to various tractates, chiefly Eruvin, Yoma, Mo'ed Katan, Yevamot, Ketubbot, Kiddushin, Nedarim, Bava Kamma, and Zevaḥim. He wrote numerous responsa, some of which are quoted in the Haggahot Maimuniyyot, the Or Zaru'a and in other works. During the Maimonidean controversy, Meir b. Todros Abulafia, an opponent of the books of Maimonides, approached him in 1202 to express his opinion. Among those who addressed problems to him was Jonathan b. David, the leading scholar of Lunel. There is mention of a work by him on the Passover seder, entitled Yesod Rabbenu Yiẓḥak b. Avraham be-Leilei Pesaḥ. His pupils included Nathan b. Meir and *Judah b. Yakar, the teachers of Naḥmanides, and Samuel b. Elhanan.

References 

12th-century French  rabbis
13th-century French rabbis
French Tosafists